Brahim Loksairi (born 1958) is a Moroccan wrestler. He competed at the 1984 Summer Olympics and the 1988 Summer Olympics.

References

External links
 

1958 births
Living people
Moroccan male sport wrestlers
Olympic wrestlers of Morocco
Wrestlers at the 1984 Summer Olympics
Wrestlers at the 1988 Summer Olympics
Place of birth missing (living people)
20th-century Moroccan people
21st-century Moroccan people